Edith Segal Motridge (July 30, 1913 – November 1, 2007), also known by her married name Edith Polster, was an American competition swimmer who represented the United States in the 1936 Summer Olympics in Berlin, Germany.  Motridge posted a time of 1:19.6 and placed fourth in the women's 100-meter backstroke final.

External links
 

1913 births
2007 deaths
American female backstroke swimmers
Olympic swimmers of the United States
Swimmers from San Francisco
Swimmers at the 1936 Summer Olympics
20th-century American women
20th-century American people
21st-century American women